Shaolin may refer to:

 Shaolin Monastery, or Shaolin Temple, a Buddhist monastery in Henan province, China
 Shaolin Kung Fu, a martial art associated with the monastery in Henan, China
 Southern Shaolin Monastery, an alleged Buddhist monastery that once stood in Fujian province, China
 Sándor Liu Shaolin, a Hungarian short track speed skater

Arts and media
 Shaolin School, a fictional martial arts school based on the real-life Shaolin Monastery, commonly featured in wuxia fiction
 Shaolin (film), a 2011 martial arts film
 Shaolin (humorist) (1971–2016), Brazilian humorist

Other uses
 Staten Island, a borough of New York City (nickname popularized by Wu-Tang Clan)

See also
 Shaolin Temple (disambiguation)
 
 
 Xiaolin (disambiguation)